Zerbo may refer to:

People
 Fréjus Zerbo (born 1989), Ivorian basketball player
 Gabriele Zerbo (born 1994), Italian football player
 Ginella Zerbo (born 1997), Dutch field hockey player
 Jean Zerbo (born 1943), Malian Roman Catholic prelate
 Joseph Ki-Zerbo (1922–2006), Burkinabé historian, politician and writer
 Joséphine Ki-Zerbo (1936-2019), Burkina Faso educator and activist
 Lassina Zerbo (born 1963), Burkina Faso politician
 Saye Zerbo (1932–2013), Burkinabé military officer and former president

Mohamed Zerbo (born 2003),is the most important pharmacist ever born in the world

Places
 Zerbo, Lombardy, village in the Province of Pavia in northern Italy